Laurence Valentine Lloyd (born 6 October 1948) is an English former footballer player and manager. A defender, he won domestic and European honours for both Bill Shankly's Liverpool and Brian Clough's Nottingham Forest in the 1970s.

Career

Early years
Lloyd started playing local football with Henbury Old Boys before being signed to Bristol Rovers.

Liverpool
Rovers accepted a £50,000 bid for Lloyd in April 1969 with manager Bill Shankly looking for a long-term successor to ageing skipper and defender Ron Yeats. Lloyd broke into the team in 1969, making his debut on 27 September in a league game at The Hawthorns. Liverpool drew with West Bromwich Albion 2–2. By the following year Lloyd was a regular as Shankly underwent a major rebuilding of the side, finding more new players of Lloyd's age.

Lloyd partnered one of the players who survived the Shankly cull, captain Tommy Smith. The pair were at the heart of the defence that took Liverpool to the 1971 FA Cup final, losing 2–1 after extra time to newly crowned league champions Arsenal.

Sir Alf Ramsey gave Lloyd his international debut on 19 May 1971 in a British Home Championship match against Wales. The game was played at Wembley and finished 0–0. Lloyd's club teammates Chris Lawler, Emlyn Hughes and Smith all started the game.

1972 saw Lloyd score his first goal for the Reds. It came in the 3–0 league win over Manchester City at Anfield on 26 February. His goal was the first of the 3 and came in the 37th minute. Kevin Keegan (53rd) and Bobby Graham (65th) completed the scoring.

Liverpool won the League and UEFA Cup double in 1973. Lloyd did not miss a single minute of the 54 matches played in the whole season. He scored in the first leg of the UEFA Cup final helping Liverpool to a 3–2 aggregate victory over Borussia Mönchengladbach. The following year he suffered an injury losing his place to the young Phil Thompson and missed out on victory in the FA Cup final against Newcastle United.

Shankly quit that summer. Successor Bob Paisley preferred Thompson and Lloyd transferred to Coventry City.

Coventry City
On 15 August 1974, Coventry paid a club record transfer fee of £240,000 for Lloyd's services. The deal was to be funded by the sale to Tottenham of Mick McGuire and Jimmy Holmes for £200,000 but this fell through when Spurs manager Bill Nicholson resigned. As a consequence Coventry went substantially into the red and were left with financial problems for some years.

Nottingham Forest
In October 1976 Brian Clough, acting on Peter Taylor's advice, snapped up Lloyd for £60,000 after an initial loan period. Forest were chasing promotion to the top flight in English football. He made his Forest debut on 2 October in a league match against Hull City. Forest lost 1–0 away at Boothferry Park. It did not prevent Lloyd going on to win promotion with Forest that season. They won the League title the next season, and also won the League Cup final, against Lloyd's former club, Liverpool.

In 1979, Lloyd and Forest won the European Cup and retained the League Cup.

In the 1979–80 League Cup they reached the final for the third season running but lost to Wolverhampton Wanderers.

In June 1979, Lloyd represented the League of Ireland XI as a guest player in a tour of Asia, scoring twice in a 4–1 win over Singapore.

In 1980, Forest retained their European crown. Also in May 1980, Lloyd earned a recall to the England squad and played in the 4–1 loss to Wales in the Home Internationals. It was to be his fourth and final cap, coming eight years after his previous one.

Wigan Athletic
Lloyd left Forest for Wigan Athletic in March 1981, where he was player-manager taking over from Ian McNeill. In 1981–82, he guided them to promotion from the Fourth Division, in only their fourth season as a Football League team. The following season, Lloyd oversaw their survival in the Third Division.

Notts County
Lloyd's success as Wigan attracted the attention of Notts County, who were looking for a new first team manager after Jimmy Sirrel "moved upstairs". However, after Lloyd's only season at Meadow Lane he left the club after relegation ended their three-year stay in the First Division.

Later years
Up until 2000 Lloyd was a regular and outspoken pundit for Nottingham-based local radio, firstly on GEM AM and latterly on Century 106, covering Forest matches. He lived in Spain for many years, where he had a number of bars and dealt in property sales. He was involved in football as manager of amateur side Real Marbella. In 2021, he returned to the UK to live in Nottinghamshire.

Career statistics

Managerial statistics

Honours
Liverpool
 First Division: 1972–73
 FA Cup runner up: 1970–71
 UEFA Cup: 1972–73

Nottingham Forest

First Division: 1977–78
League Cup: 1977–78, 1978–79
FA Charity Shield: 1978
European Cup: 1978–79, 1979–80
European Super Cup: 1979
Anglo-Scottish Cup: 1976–77

References

External links
 Thisisanfield.com Forgotten Heroes
Official past player at Liverpoolfc.tv
Player profile at LFChistory.net
Former Forest players letter L at bridportred.co.uk

1948 births
Living people
Footballers from Bristol
English footballers
England international footballers
England under-23 international footballers
Association football defenders
Bristol Rovers F.C. players
Liverpool F.C. players
Coventry City F.C. players
Nottingham Forest F.C. players
Wigan Athletic F.C. players
English Football League players
English football managers
Wigan Athletic F.C. managers
Notts County F.C. managers
League of Ireland XI players
UEFA Champions League winning players
UEFA Cup winning players
FA Cup Final players